Mangamma is the name of the Hindu goddess Alamelu. It may also refer to:

 Mangamma (film), a 1997 Malayalam language film
 Mangamma Gari Manavadu, a 1984 Telugu language film
 Mangamma Sapatham (disambiguation)
 Mangamma Sapatham (1943 film), a Tamil language film
 Mangamma Sapatham (1965 film), a Telugu language film
 Mangamma Sabadham (1985 film), a Tamil language film

Also see 
 Mangammal (died 1705), queen regent of the Madurai Nayak kingdom

Feminine given names